The Igreja de Nossa Senhora da Boa Fé is a church in Nossa Senhora da Boa Fé, Évora, Portugal. It is classified as a National Monument.

Churches in Évora District
National monuments in Évora District